Katera is a town and a nagar panchayat in Jhansi district in the Indian state of Uttar Pradesh.

Demographics
As of the 2001 Census of India, Katera had a population of 6,389. Males constitute 54% of the population and females 46%. Katera has an average literacy rate of 51%, lower than the national average of 59.5%: male literacy is 62%, and female literacy is 38%. In Katera, 16% of the population is under 6 years of age.

References

Cities and towns in Jhansi district